The main campus of the Georgia Institute of Technology occupies part of Midtown Atlanta, primarily bordered by 10th Street to the north, North Avenue to the south, and, with the exception of Tech Square, the Downtown Connector to the East, placing it well in sight of the Atlanta skyline. In 1996, the campus was the site of the athletes' village and a venue for a number of athletic events for the 1996 Summer Olympics. The construction of the Olympic Village, along with subsequent gentrification of the surrounding areas, significantly changed the campus.

The Georgia Tech campus is located in Midtown, an area north of downtown Atlanta. Although a number of skyscrapers (most visibly AT&T Midtown Center, One Coca-Cola Plaza, and Bank of America Plaza) are visible from all points on campus, the campus itself has few buildings over four stories and has a great deal of greenery. This gives it a distinctly suburban atmosphere quite different from other Atlanta campuses such as that of Georgia State University.

In addition to the main campus, Georgia Tech also operates satellite campuses in Savannah, Georgia (Georgia Tech Savannah); Metz, France (Georgia Tech Lorraine); Athlone, Ireland; Shenzhen, China; and Singapore.

Organization
The campus is organized into four main parts: West Campus, East Campus, Central Campus, and Technology Square. West Campus and East Campus are both occupied primarily by student living complexes, while Central Campus is reserved primarily for teaching and research buildings.

West Campus

Formerly the location of the Hemphill Avenue neighborhood, Georgia Tech began to expand into this area in 1965. West Campus is occupied primarily by apartments and coed undergraduate dormitories. Apartments include Crecine, Center Street, Zbar, Maulding, Nelson-Shell, and Eighth Street Apartments (all of which were built as part of the 1996 Olympic Village), while dorms include Freeman, Montag, Fitten, Folk, Caldwell, Armstrong, Hefner, Fulmer, and Woodruff Suites. The Campus Recreation Center (formerly the Student Athletic Complex); a volleyball court; a large, low natural green area known as the Burger Bowl; and a flat artificial green area known as the Stamps Field (formerly SAC Field) are all located on the western side of the campus.

West Campus was formerly home to Under the Couch, which relocated to the Student Center in the fall of 2010. Also within walking distance of West Campus are several late-night eateries, primarily on Northside Drive. Engineer's Bookstore, an economical alternative to Georgia Tech's official bookstore, also operated near West Campus until its closure in 2016. West campus was home to a convenience store, West Side Market, which closed in 2017. Due to limited space, all auto travel proceeds via a network of one-way streets which connects West Campus to Hemphill Avenue and Ferst Drive, the main road of the campus. Woodruff Dining Hall, or "Woody's", was the West Campus Dining Hall before its closure in 2017. It connected the Woodruff North and Woodruff South undergraduate dorms. In 2017, West Village, a multipurpose facility featuring dining options, meeting space, School of Music classrooms, and offices to West Campus, opened.

East Campus

East Campus houses all of the fraternities and sororities as well as most of the undergraduate freshman dormitories. East Campus abuts the Downtown Connector, granting residences quick access to Midtown and its businesses (for example, The Varsity) via several bridges over the highway, as well as a tunnel beneath it. Georgia Tech football's home, Bobby Dodd Stadium is located on East Campus, as well as Georgia Tech basketball's home, McCamish Pavilion (formerly Alexander Memorial Coliseum).

Brittain Dining Hall is the main dining hall for East Campus. It is modeled after a medieval church, complete with carved columns and stained glass windows showing symbolic figures. The main road leading from East Campus to Central Campus is a steep ascending incline commonly known as "Freshman Hill" (in reference to the large number of freshman dorms near its foot). On March 8, 2007, the former Georgia State University Village apartments were transferred to Georgia Tech. Renamed North Avenue Apartments by the institute, they began housing students in the fall semester of 2007.

Central Campus

Central Campus is home to the majority of the academic, research, and administrative buildings. The Central Campus includes, among others: the Howey Physics Building; the Boggs Chemistry Building; the College of Computing Building; the Klaus Advanced Computing Building; the College of Architecture Building; the D. M. Smith Building, which houses the School of Public Policy; and the Ford Environmental Science & Technology Building. In 2005, the School of Modern Languages returned to the Swann Building, a 100-year-old former dormitory that now houses some of the most technology-equipped classrooms on campus. Intermingled with these are a variety of research facilities, such as the Centennial Research Building, the Microelectronics Research Center, the Neely Nuclear Research Center (decommissioned 1999), the Nanotechnology Research Center, and the Petit Biotechnology Building.

Tech's administrative buildings, such as Tech Tower, and the Bursar's Office, are also located on the Central Campus, in the Georgia Tech Historic District. The campus library, the Student Center, and the Student Services Building ("Flag Building") are also located on Central Campus. The Student Center provides a variety of recreational and social functions for students including: a computer lab, a game room ("Tech Rec"), the Student Post Office, a music venue, a movie theater, the Food Court, plus meeting rooms for various clubs and organizations. Adjacent to the eastern entrance of the Student Center is the Kessler Campanile (which is referred to by students as "The Shaft"). The former Hightower Textile Engineering building was demolished in 2002 to create Yellow Jacket Park. More greenspace now occupies the area around the Kessler Campanile for a more aesthetically pleasing look, in accordance with the official Campus Master Plan. In August 2011, the G. Wayne Clough Undergraduate Learning Commons opened next to the library and occupies part of the Yellow Jacket Park area.

The "Robert Ferst Center for the Arts", located next to the student center, is Georgia Tech's theater and arts center, and adjoins DramaTech, the student run theater. It contains a 1,155-seat auditorium that features a proscenium stage, orchestra pit, and theatrical lighting and sound systems.

Technology Square

Technology Square, also known as "Tech Square", is located across the Downtown Connector and embedded in the city east of East Campus. Opened in August 2003 at a cost of $179 million, the district was built over run-down neighborhoods and has sparked a revitalization of the entire Midtown area. Connected by the recently renovated Fifth Street Bridge, it is a pedestrian-friendly area comprising Georgia Tech facilities and retail locations. One complex contains the College of Business Building, holding classrooms and office space for the Scheller College of Business, as well as the Georgia Tech Hotel and Conference Center and the Georgia Tech Global Learning Center. Another part of Tech Square, the privately owned Centergy One complex, contains the Technology Square Research Building (TSRB), holding faculty and graduate student offices for the College of Computing and the School of Electrical and Computer Engineering, as well as the GVU Center, a multidisciplinary technology research center. The Advanced Technology Development Center (ATDC) is a science and business incubator, run by the Georgia Institute of Technology, and is also headquartered in Technology Square's Centergy One complex.

Other Georgia Tech-affiliated buildings in the area host the Center for Quality Growth and Regional Development, the Georgia Tech Enterprise Innovation Institute, the Advanced Technology Development Center, VentureLab, and the Georgia Electronic Design Center. Technology Square also hosts a variety of restaurants and businesses, including the headquarters of notable consulting companies like Accenture and also including the official Institute bookstore, a Barnes & Noble bookstore, and a Georgia Tech-themed Waffle House.

Academic buildings

Clough Undergraduate Learning Commons 

Opened in Fall 2011, the G. Wayne Clough Undergraduate Learning Commons (Clough Commons, or CULC) is a 220,000 square foot academic building located on Central Campus, adjacent to Tech Green. The building is named after former Georgia Tech President G. Wayne Clough. It is connected to and managed by the Library and contains 41 classrooms and two 300-seat auditoriums.

Coon Building 

Located on Central Campus as part of Georgia Tech's Historic District, the John Saylor Coon Building was constructed in 1912 and is one of the oldest buildings on campus. Originally called the New Shop Building, the building served as a home for shops and the mechanical engineering department, and continued to be used by the mechanical engineering department until 2001, when it became the home for the School of Psychology. The building gained its current name in 1922, following the retirement of noted professor John Saylor Coon. Between October 2001 and September 2003 the building underwent an extensive $9.1 million renovation that added 11,000 square feet to the facilities. The project received praise for being completed both under budget and on time.

Couch Building 

Located on McMillan Street on West Campus, the J. Allen Couch Building serves as the home for the School of Music, a division of the College of Design. Named after Tech alum and prominent Atlanta citizen J. Allen Couch, the building was constructed in 1935 at a cost of $347,000. The building also houses several music practice rooms and a recording studio, and was the former home for Under the Couch before it relocated to the Student Center in 2010.

Ford Environmental Science and Technology Building 
Located on Central Campus, the Ford Environmental Science and Technology Building opened in 2002 and is named after its principal donor, the Ford Motor Company. At 287,000 square feet, it was the largest academic building on campus at the time of its construction and primarily provides classroom space for the School of Chemical and Biomolecular Engineering. The building was constructed for a cost of $58 million.

Guggenheim Building 

Located at the corner of Cherry Street and North Avenue on Central Campus, the Daniel Guggenheim Aerospace (formerly Aeronautics) Building was constructed in 1931 at a cost of $91,088 as the first building for what is now the Daniel Guggenheim School of Aerospace Engineering. Both the school and the building were named after the Daniel Guggenheim Fund for the Promotion of Aeronautics, which funded the building's construction. The building is connected to the Montgomery Knight Building, another AE building. The building has 12,900 square-feet of classrooms, offices, and laboratories.

Hall Building 

The Stephen C. Hall Building is a small academic building on Central Campus. Built in 1924 as the Navy ROTC Building, the 11,000 square foot building underwent a major renovation in 2012 and now houses the Writing and Communication Program of the Ivan Allen College of Liberal Arts. The building is named for the major donor for the renovation, retired USAF Colonel and Georgia Tech alum Stephen C. Hall. The building is located on Bobby Dodd Way, on the incline known as Freshman Hill.

Howey Physics Building 

The Joseph H. Howey Physics Building is the main academic building for the School of Physics. Located on Central Campus, the building was opened in 1967 and named after Joseph H. Howey, who had served as director of the school from 1935 to 1963. The building includes 26,000 square feet of instructional space and 156,000 square feet of research laboratory space.

Klaus Advanced Computing Building 

Officially opened on October 26, 2006, the Christopher W. Klaus Advanced Computing Building is a 414,000 square foot academic building located on Central Campus. Named after Georgia Tech alum Chris Klaus, whose $15 million donation financed the building's construction, the building houses the School of Computer Science, the School of Computational Science and Engineering, and multiple classrooms and laboratories for other departments. The building includes 70 research laboratories, six instructional labs, and five large classrooms, in addition to a 200-seat auditorium.

Library 

The Georgia Tech Library is the academic library of the Georgia Institute of Technology. Located on Central Campus, the library consists of two connected main buildings: the S. Price Gilbert Memorial Library, which opened in 1953, and Crosland Tower, which opened in 1969 as the library's graduate addition.

Mason Building 
Located on Central Campus, the Jesse W. Mason Building is the main academic building for the School of Civil and Environmental Engineering. The 90,000 square foot facility was originally constructed in 1969 and named after Jesse W. Mason, a former dean of the College of Engineering. Between 2012 and 2013 the building underwent a $12.5 million renovation project that included the removal of asbestos, HVAC updates, and a new student commons area, among other improvements.

Swann Building 

The Janie Austell Swann Building is an academic building on Central Campus and a part of Georgia Tech's Historic District. The building was dedicated in 1901 following a donation by James Swann and named in memory of his deceased wife. While initially constructed as a dormitory, the building now houses the School of Modern Languages. The building has experienced renovations in 1964 and 2006.

Van Leer Building 

The Blake R. Van Leer Electrical and Computer Engineering Building houses the main offices of the School of Electrical and Computer Engineering, as well as multiple ECE classrooms and research labs. Completed in 1962, it was originally known as the New Electrical Engineering Building and is currently named for Georgia Tech's fifth president, Blake Ragsdale Van Leer. Since 1962, the building has also housed the Georgia Tech Amateur Radio Club, with multiple antennas located on the roof of the building. The building is located on Central Campus, on the north edge of Tech Green.

Whitaker Building 
Located on Central Campus, the U.A. Whitaker Building serves as the main home for the Wallace H. Coulter Department of Biomedical Engineering. Construction of the 99,822 square foot building began in 2002 and cost $23 million. The building is named for noted philanthropist Uncas A. Whitaker.

Research buildings

Marcus Nanotechnology Building 

Located on Central Campus, the Marcus Nanotechnology Building is a research facility and headquarters for the Institute of Electronics and Nanotechnology (IEN). Originally opened in 2009 as the Marcus Nanotechnology Research Center, the building adopted its current name in 2013. Of note, the building houses the largest cleanroom laboratory dedicated to the fabrication, characterization, and assembly of biomedical and semiconductor devices in the Southeast United States.

Residence halls
Housing at Georgia Tech consists of both apartments and residence halls, with residence halls primarily serving first-year students (a system known as Freshman Experience) and apartments generally serving upperclassmen. With the exception of North Avenue Apartments, all apartments are located on west campus, whereas residence halls can be found on both east and west campus.

Residence Halls

Armstrong Hall 

Armstrong Residence Hall is a coed residence hall in the Georgia Tech Freshman Experience and Honors Program, dedicated in name to Arthur H. Armstrong. It is located on West Campus, near West Village. Armstrong Hall was built in 1969 and last renovated in 2006. It consists of four floors and as of 2019 has a bed count of 114.

Brown Hall 

Brown Residence Hall is a coed residence hall in the Georgia Tech Freshman Experience, dedicated in name of Julis L. Brown. It was built in 1925 and last renovated in 1993.  Brown is located on the northeast corner of North Avenue and Techwood Drive. Brown Hall is the oldest active residence hall on campus, and is also the smallest of the institute's residence halls. It consists of four floors, with only three housing residents, and as of 2019 has a bed count of 91. The building has experienced flex spaces similar to Smith Hall in that a bathroom was converted into a bedroom. While residents were living in this room, the remainders of toilet plumbing still protruded from the flooring.

On September 9, 2004, a resident in Brown committed suicide.

Caldwell Hall 

Caldwell Residence Hall is a coed residence hall in the Georgia Tech Freshman Experience. Caldwell is a coed by floor and is the sibling dorm of Folk. The building is named after Hugh H. Caldwell, a Registrar for Georgia Tech in the early 1920s and 1930s. Caldwell originally cost $478,000 to construct and was designed by the architects Bull & Kenney. It was built in 1969 and last renovated in 2002, and as of 2019 it has a bed count of 158.

In 2001, a group known as the "Caldwell Liberation Army" stole or vandalized over thirty signs removing the letter T. The group was upset by the renovations of Caldwell, which displaced all 157 residents for a year.

In Fall 2006, Caldwell housed the infamous "triples," which was a project that put three residents into a two-man room. Certain pieces of furniture were not provided to the third resident as to accommodate a third bed. When spaces became available in other parts of campus, the third resident was moved elsewhere.

Cloudman Hall 

Cloudman Residence Hall is a residence hall in the Georgia Tech Freshman Experience. Cloudman Hall is dedicated to Josiah Cloudman.  Cloudman was built in 1931 and last renovated in 1995. Cloudman originally cost $128,000 to construct and was designed by architects Bush-Brown, Gailey & Associates. Cloudman is set to be renovated again in the coming decade. As of 2019 it has a bed count of 119.

It is by the northern wing of Brittain Dining Hall, while Harris Hall is the southern wing.  Cloudman is a coed residence hall.

Cloudman Hall was the site of a dry ice bombing that resulted in the Atlanta Bomb Squad responding in October 2005.  A Glenn Hall resident had made several dry ice bombs and left them outside of the hall.  The preceding morning, a facilities employee detonated the bombs by accident causing slight hearing damage.  The student was initially charged with felony possession of a destructive device and reckless conduct.

Field Hall 

Field Residence Hall is a coed residence hall in the Freshman Experience and Impact Program. Field was built in 1961 and last renovated in 2005. It is located on East Campus and as of 2019 it has a bed count of 126.

Fitten Hall 

Fitten Residence Hall is a residence hall in the Georgia Tech Freshman Experience. It is named in honor of Louise M. Fitten. Fitten was built in 1972 and last renovated in 2012. As of 2019 it has a bed count of 128.

Fitten is coed by floor and part of Fitten, Freeman, and Montag group often abbreviated "FFM."

Fitten originally cost $729,000 to construct and was designed by Bradbury & Associates.

Folk Hall 

Folk Residence Hall is a coed residence hall in the Georgia Tech Freshman Experience.  Folk originally cost $478,000 to construct and was designed by the architects Bull & Kenney. As of 2019 it has a bed count of 156.

Folk is coed by floor. It is the sibling dorm of Caldwell, both being constructed mirror images of one another in 1969. It was last renovated in 2005.

The dorm is named after Edwin H. Folk, an esteemed English professor at Georgia Tech.  He taught from 1924 to 1959 and became one of the most popular professors on campus during his tenure.

Circa 1980 students blocked off the 1st-floor bathroom with plywood, purposely clogged bathroom drains and then turned on all water faucets; purposely creating a swimming pool out of the 1st floor bathroom.

In fall 1993, Folk was converted to an all-female dorm. A sizable remnant of Folk males made it over to Caldwell.

In Fall 2006, Folk housed the infamous "triples", which was a project that put three residents into a two-man room. Certain pieces of furniture were not provided to the third resident as to accommodate a third bed. When spaces became available in other parts of campus, the third resident was moved elsewhere.

Freeman Hall 

Freeman Residence Hall is a residence hall in the Georgia Tech Freshman Experience. Freeman is coed by floor and part of Fitten, Freeman, and Montag group often abbreviated "FFM." Freeman was originally built for $580,000 and was designed by the architects Bradbury & Associates. The hall was last renovated in 2011 and as of 2019 has a bed count of 112.

The dorm is named after famous movie producer and Tech alum Y. Frank Freeman. He produced titles such as The Biscuit Eaters, The Naked Jungle, Omar Kahyyam, and The War of the Worlds.

Chris Klaus, founder of Kaneva, Inc. and Internet Security Systems (ISS), cited his stay in Freeman Hall as one of the reasons he made a $15 million (USD) donation to Georgia Tech.

Fulmer Hall

Fulmer Residence Hall is a traditional-style female residence hall at the Georgia Institute of Technology. It opened in 1969 as the first female dormitory on the campus and was last renovated in 2000.  It is dedicated to Herman K. Fulmer, who was an associate professor of Mathematics at Georgia Tech. As of 2019 it has a bed count of 60, making it one of the smallest residence halls on campus.

Fulmer originally cost $327,000 to construct and was designed by James C. Wise, Simpson, Aiken and Associates.

Glenn Hall 

Glenn Residence Hall is a co-ed residence hall in the Georgia Tech Freshman Experience that was previously all male. Glenn is dedicated to William H. Glenn, Tech alumnus. Glenn Hall is a prime location for the Georgia Tech sports fan; it is the closest freshman residence hall to Bobby Dodd Stadium and Alexander Memorial Coliseum, and is right next to the lawn known as the Quad. It is also next to the GT Connector, a newly built study space between Glenn and Towers that also includes a small gym. It was last renovated in 2015 and as of 2019 has a bed count of 351.

William H. Glenn graduated from Georgia Tech in 1891 with a degree in mechanical engineering. Glenn is most famous at Georgia Tech for assisting in the creation of the Georgia Tech Alumni Association, of which he was president in 1921.  After his graduation, Glenn became a successful businessman working for the Georgia Railway & Electric Company and the Southeastern Compress & Warehouse Company.

Glenn Hall originally cost $607,000 to construct and was designed by Bush-Brown, Gailey, & Heffernan in 1947.  Glenn is the largest capacity dormitory in Freshman Experience Program. Glenn Hall has four floors of residents and is flanked by Bobby Dodd Stadium and Towers Hall.

Glenn Hall was the site of a dry ice bombing that resulted in the Atlanta Bomb Squad responding in October 2005.  A resident had made several dry ice bombs and left them outside of the hall.  The proceeding morning, a facilities employee detonated the bombs by accident causing slight hearing damage.  The student was initially charged with felony possession of a destructive device and reckless conduct.

One of the largest rivalries in Georgia Tech Housing is between Glenn and its archrival Towers Hall.  Vandalism, pranks, and competition in various events are common amongst the two dormitories although the destructive facet of this rivalry is highly discouraged.

Annually since 2006, there has been a competition between Glenn and Towers called "The Battle for the Quad" in which the two battle for ownership of the quad separating the two buildings. The competition is set up as a week-long collection of various sporting events (such as soccer, basketball, pool, bowling, dodgeball, paintball, etc.), the championship going to whichever dorm claims the most victories. There are usually eight events, with a tie breaking tug-of-war competition if needed. Towers won the first Battle for the Quad, with a repeat victory the next year. However, in the 08–09 school year, Glenn answered with their first victory, 5–3. Towers then had a winning streak for a few years, and Glenn broke that streak with a win in the 11–12 school year. The competition did not take place in 2013 and 2014 as Glenn and Towers were being renovated, but was restarted in the 2015–16 school year, now taking place over one day and including other, non sporting events. Glenn is the current champion.

The Glenn Hall Goatman was first conceived for Glenn Hall intramurals in the Fall of 2002.  The term Goatman was unofficially applied to any male who lived or had lived in Glenn Hall.  The term was first officially applied to Glenn residents in Fall of 2003 when several Glenn Housing fliers made references to the Goatman.  The most famous flier was made before the annual UGA game and it depicted a half-man half-goat sending lightning towards Athens, Georgia.  In Fall of 2006 the Goatman adorned Glenn intramural jerseys for the first time. Despite initial discouragement, the Goatman remains the only official mascot for any hall in the Freshman Experience.

Hanson Hall 

Hanson Residence Hall is a residence hall located on East Campus in the Georgia Tech Freshman Experience. Hanson is dedicated to John F. Hanson and is coed. The hall was built in 1961 and last renovated in 2002. As of 2019 it has a bed count of 118.

Harris Hall 

Harris Residence Hall is a residence hall located on East Campus in the Georgia Tech Freshman Experience. Harris is dedicated to N.E. Harris and is coed. The hall was built in 1926 and last renovated in 1992. As of 2019 it has a bed count of 94.

Harrison Hall 

Harrison Residence Hall is a residence hall in the Georgia Tech Freshman Experience. Harrison is dedicated to George W. Harrison and currently all female.  Harrison is the sister building to Howell Hall, both being built in 1939 behind Brittain Dining Hall.  Harrison originally cost $183,000 to construct and was designed by the architects Bush-Brown & Gailey.

Harrison is the only FE building which features individual study cubicles on the third floor.  The cubicles are built into a hallway that leads in Harrison's upper study lounge. Harrison also houses FE North's primary Learning Assistance Program location in its larger second floor lounge. The building was last renovated in 1998. As of 2019 it has a bed count of 155.

Hefner Hall 

Hefner Residence Hall is a residence hall on West Campus in the Georgia Tech Freshman Experience and Honors Program. The hall was named for Ralph A. Hefner. It was built in 1969 and last renovated in 2008. As of 2019 it has a bed count of 112.

Hopkins Hall 

Hopkins Residence Hall is a residence hall located on East Campus in the Georgia Tech Freshman Experience. The hall was named for Isaac S. Hopkins. It was built in 1961 and last renovated in 1995. As of 2019 it has a bed count of 134.

Howell Hall 

Howell Residence Hall is a residence hall in the Georgia Tech Freshman Experience. It is named for Clark Howell, original endower of the WBBF radio station, which later became WGST and WAFS and is now WGKA.  Howell Hall was designed by architects Bush-Brown & Gailey for $163,000.  Originally constructed in 1939, it underwent renovation as part of Georgia Tech's effort to renovate residence halls preceding the 1996 Olympics.

The building is located among Smith, Harrison, Brittain Dining, and N Williams St. (the I-85-North Ave exit) and features the only quad in FE North.

There are four floors in Howell, with the zero floor dedicated to an exercise room, bicycle closet, and a television lounge. Its first and third floors house females, while its second floor houses males. The hall was last renovated in 1999 and as of 2019 has a bed count of 123.

Starting in the fall of 2012, Howell Hall housed only members of the Grand Challenges Program.

Matheson Hall 

Matheson Residence Hall is a residence hall on East Campus in the Georgia Tech Freshman Experience and Global Leadership Program. The hall was built in 1961 and last renovated in 2002. As of 2019 it has a bed count of 152.

Montag Hall

Montag Residence Hall is a residence hall in the Georgia Tech Freshman Experience.
Montag is coed by floor and part of Fitten, Freeman, and Montag group often abbreviated "FFM."  The building is named after Harold E. Montag, a 1918 Tech alum. The hall was built in 1972, last renovated in 2011, and as of 2019 has a bed count of 114.

Montag was originally built for $632,000 and was designed by the architects Bradbury & Associates.

Perry Hall 

Perry Residence Hall is a residence hall on East Campus in the Georgia Tech Freshman Experience and Global Leadership Program. The hall was built in 1961 and last renovated in 2002. As of 2019 it has a bed count of 122.

Smith Hall 

Smith Residence Hall is a residence hall dedicated to John M. Smith, member of the first graduating class in Tech history. Smith Hall was designed under President Van Leer's tenure by the architects Bush-Brown, Gailey and Heffernan and built for $614,000.

Smith Hall was originally designed as the athlete dormitory with a built-in cafeteria and hot tub. The cafeteria on the third floor has since been converted into a lounge but still retains the cafeteria serving line and salad bar. The room was the 6-man flex space in the Fall 2004-Spring 2005 and Fall 2005-Spring 2006 school years. Other dormitories experienced the flex spaces but not to the extent of Smith which could increase its capacity by 14 additional residents. The hot tub was located in the modern day Hall Director office and pipes from the tub remained in Smith up until Summer of 2003 during renovation.

Smith is the largest Freshman Experience dorm by area with 5 total floors, allocating 4 for residents. 0 floor houses East Campus custodial services. The broad side faces North Ave and the building is flanked by Brown Hall and Williams Street. Smith was the Southeasternmost point of campus until Georgia Tech's acquisition of the North Avenue Apartment Complex (formerly the Georgia State Village), and is closest to the last defenses of Atlanta during the Civil War.

The Southeast corner of Smith leads to a large foyer that opens into a walled-in green space. This green space was the extreme Southeastern point of Georgia Tech from 1996 to 2007. Before 1996, Techwood Dorm was the Southeastern tip of Georgia Tech and in 2007 the acquisition of the Georgia State Village (now known as North Avenue Apartments) has once again displaced Smith as the closest Tech building to the Varsity. Smith is approximately 500 feet from the Atlanta landmark.

The hall was last renovated in 1993 and as of 2019 has a bed count of 295.

Towers Hall 

Towers Residence Hall is a co-ed residence hall in the Georgia Tech Freshman Experience located on the east side of campus. Towers is dedicated to Donigan Dean Towers.

Towers Residence Hall originally cost $481,000 to construct and was designed by architects Bush-Brown, Gailey, & Heffernan. It was built in 1947 by contractor J. A. Jones.

Towers was home to Dean James E. Dull during the early 1960s. While he resided in the staff apartment, he spotted a Ford Model A outside of Towers that would eventually become the Ramblin' Wreck.

Since 1990, Towers has hosted an annual haunted house in its attic.  Georgia Tech students are invited every Halloween to enjoy the pranks and props in the attic created by East Campus residents.

In Fall 2006, Towers hall housed the infamous "triples", which was a project that put three residents into a two-man room. Certain pieces of furniture were not provided to the third resident as to accommodate a third bed. When spaces became available in other parts of campus, the third resident was moved elsewhere.

Towers is an archrival to neighbor dorm Glenn Hall. Glenn and Towers compete in an annual "Battle for the Quad" in which the winner determines the name of the greenspace located between the two structures. Towers had held the rights to the quad since Spring 2007 until Spring 2009, when Glenn finally won. Towers won in Spring 2010 and defended their title in Spring 2011. Following the pattern of two-year wins for Towers and one for Glenn, the rites were given back to Glenn in Spring 2012. Breaking this pattern, Glenn defended their title in 2016 when the Battle of the Quad returned after a short hiatus while the two buildings were being renovated.

Towers Hall also manages to field competitive teams outside of the interhall rivalry.  Towers is always a strong competitor in the Mini 500 and the only Freshman Experience Residence Hall to win the men's division since FE's first year of 1992.

While the idea of a Towers mascot had been considered multiple years with such incarnations as a Spartan and a Chubacabra (an animal that preys on goats, the mascot of rival Glenn Hall). Residents of Towers have most recently been referred to as the Knights of Towers. Knights were chosen based on the qualities of strength, bravery, physical and mental fortitude, and chivalry.

In May 2013, Towers was taken offline as part of a two-year $41.5M renovation project to both Towers and Glenn Hall. The renovations will upgrade electrical, plumbing, HVAC, and fire protection systems of both buildings. There will also be new laundry rooms, bathrooms and study rooms amongst other amenities on each floor. For the first time in the buildings' history, elevators will be installed. A connecting building will also be constructed between Towers and Glenn, fulfilling the original 1940 master plan, which will include other student services. Renovations were completed for Towers before the 2014–2015 school year. Glenn was taken offline in May 2014 for its phase of the renovation and reopened in July 2015

Woodruff Hall 

Woodruff Residence Hall is a coed residence hall located on West Campus. The hall is divided into two sections, Woodruff North and Woodruff South. Prior to its closure, these two buildings were linked by Woodruff Dining Hall. Both buildings were built in 1984 and as of 2019 had a combined total bed count of 532.

Apartments 
The apartments on Georgia Tech's main campus were originally constructed as part of the Olympic Village for the 1996 Olympic Games. In preparation for the games, seven apartment-style residence halls were constructed for $108.3 million.

Center Street Apartments 

Center Street Apartments are apartment-style residence halls at Georgia Tech. They opened in 1995 as housing for the athletes and journalists at the 1996 Summer Olympics in Atlanta, GA as a part of the Olympic Village.

The Apartments are separated into 2 buildings which are known as either North or South.  North houses 160 residents and South houses 192.  Together, the Center Street Apartments originally cost $14.024 million to construct and was designed by John Portman & Associates.  John Portman is a famous alumnus of the university, graduating from Georgia Tech in 1950.

Crecine Apartments

Crecine Apartments is an apartment-style residence hall at Georgia Tech. It opened in 1995 as housing for the athletes and journalists at the 1996 Summer Olympics in Atlanta, GA as a part of the Olympic Village.
Crecine originally cost $13.235 million to construct and was designed by Jova Daniel Busby.

Crecine was originally known as Hemphill Avenue Apartments based on its location and proximity to Hemphill Avenue as was consistent with other apartment style housing on campus. Hemphill was renamed to Crecine in Fall 2008 in honor of former Georgia Tech President John Patrick Crecine, who had died earlier in the year.

Eighth Street Apartments

Eighth Street Apartments are apartment-style residence halls at Georgia Tech. They opened in 1995 as housing for the athletes and journalists at the 1996 Summer Olympics in Atlanta, GA as a part of the Olympic Village.

The Apartments are separated into 3 buildings which are known as either East, South, or West.  East houses 216 residents, South houses 188, and West houses 248.  Together, the Eighth Street Apartments originally cost $24.844 million to construct and was designed by Cooper Carry.

Maulding Apartments 

Maulding Apartments are apartment-style residence halls at Georgia Tech located on West Campus. The apartments were built in 1995 and served as part of the Olympic Village for the 1996 Olympic Games. As of 2019 it has a bed count of 249.

Nelson Shell Apartments 

Nelson Shell Apartments are apartment-style residence halls located on West Campus. The apartments were built in 1992 and last renovated in 2013, when the name was changed from Undergraduate Living Center to its current name. As of 2019 it has a bed count of 430.

North Avenue Apartments 

North Avenue Apartments are apartment-style residence halls at Georgia Tech. They opened in 1995 as housing for the athletes and journalists at the 1996 Summer Olympics in Atlanta, GA as a part of the Olympic Village.

The Apartments are separated into 4 buildings which are known as East, North, South, or West.

Zbar Apartments 

Zbar Apartments, formerly known as Sixth Street Apartments, are apartment-style residence halls located on West Campus. The apartments were built in 1995. As of 2019 it has a bed count of 228.

Houses 
These four houses were built as part of the 1996 Olympic Village and originally known collectively as the Fourth Street Apartments. Currently they serve as housing for members of specific programs, such as the Women, Science, & Technology Program or the International House Program.

Goldin House 

Goldin House is an apartment-style residence hall located on East Campus available for members of the Women, Science, & Technology (WST) Program. The hall was named in honor of Carolina and Jim Goldin. It is an all female residence hall that was built in 1955. It has three floors and as of 2019 has a bed count of 24.

Gray House 

Gray House is an apartment-style residence hall located on East Campus available for members of the International House (I-House) Program. The hall was named in honor of Donald M. Gray. As of 2019 Gray House has a bed count of 24. It was built in 1995.

Hayes House 

Hayes House is an apartment-style residence hall located on East Campus available for members of the International House (I-House) Program. The hall was named in honor of Herbert B. Hayes. As of 2019 Hayes House has a bed count of 24. It was built in 1995.

Stein House 

Stein House is an apartment-style residence hall located on East Campus available for members of the Women, Science, and Technology (WST) Program. The hall was named after Jack C. Stein. It is an all female residence hall that was built in 1955. It has three floors and as of 2019 has a bed count of 24.

Graduate Housing

Graduate Living Center 

Graduate Living Center is an apartment-style residence hall located just north of main campus, available to graduate students. As of 2019 it has a bed count of 347. The center was constructed in 1992 and last renovated in 2009.

Tenth and Home Building 

Tenth and Home Building is an apartment-style residence hall located just north of main campus, available to graduate students. Tenth and Home is divided into seven buildings labeled alphabetically A through G. The hall was built in 2005 and as of 2019 has a collective bed count of 529.

Dining halls 
The main campus is currently home to two buffet-style dining halls (both located on East Campus) and one station-style dining commons (located on West Campus). In addition, multiple chain restaurants, such as Chick-fil-A, Panda Express, and Subway are present on the main campus, mainly located in the Student Center and West Village.

Brittain Dining Hall 

Marion L. Brittain Dining Hall is the oldest dining hall on campus and the main dining hall of the freshman dorms on East Campus. Opened in 1928, it cost $418,000 to construct and has been renovated in 1964, 1999, 2002, and 2007. The building is named for former Georgia Tech President Marion L. Brittain.

North Avenue Dining Hall 
Opened in Fall 2011, North Avenue Dining Hall (sometimes colloquially referred to as Nave) is a dining hall on East Campus located in the North Avenue Apartment complex. The dining hall was part of a large renovation project conducted after Georgia Tech's acquisition of the apartments from Georgia State.

West Village Dining Commons 
One of the most recent additions to Georgia Tech's culinary scene, West Village Dining Commons (colloquially known as Willage) opened in Fall 2017 and represents the multiple dining options available at the West Village Commons. Prior to its construction, the location was home to a parking lot in front of the Caldwell and Folk Residence Halls. The dining commons is a departure from the typical buffet-style dining halls and instead offers a station-style dining experience similar to a food court. Following the closure of Woodruff Dining Hall in 2017, West Village is the only campus-affiliated dining option on West Campus. In addition to the main dining hall, West Village is also home to the Wrek Stop convenience store and hamburger restaurant Cluck N Mooh.

Religious organizations 
Georgia Tech is home to a myriad of different religious and faith-based organizations, several of which have buildings on campus to serve affiliated students.

Baptist Collegiate Ministry 

Baptist Collegiate Ministry is a Baptist organization located at 740 Techwood Drive on East Campus which is supported by multiple nearby Baptist churches.

Catholic Center 

The Georgia Tech Catholic Center, located at 172 Fourth Street, is a Roman Catholic center operated by the Catholic Students Organization, an official Georgia Tech student group. The center has been at its current location since 1985.

Christian Campus Fellowship 
Christian Campus Fellowship is a non-denominational evangelical Christian group founded on campus in 1987 by Rick and Beth Harper, located at 767 Techwood Drive on East Campus.

Lutheran Campus Ministry (Grace House) 
The Grace House is a Lutheran campus ministry organization supported by the Lutheran Church of the Redeemer in Midtown Atlanta. The house is located on East Campus at 182 Fifth Street and holds worship every Tuesday night.

Methodist Center (Wesley Foundation) 

The Wesley Foundation at Georgia Tech is a Wesley Foundation sponsored by the United Methodist Church. Located at 189 Fourth Street, they hold traditional worship services every Sunday and evening services on Tuesday.

Rohr Chabad House 
The Rohr Chabad House at Georgia Tech and Georgia State is a Chabad house located just north of campus at 471 Tenth Street serving the campuses of both Georgia Tech and nearby Georgia State.

Westminster Christian Fellowship 
Located on East Campus at 724 Techwood Drive, Westminster Christian Fellowship is a Westminster-affiliated Presbyterian Christian group with worship services every Wednesday.

Sports venues 
Georgia Tech's main campus is home to multiple sports venues for the institute's multiple intercollegiate sports teams, known as the Georgia Tech Yellow Jackets.

Bobby Dodd Stadium 

Located on East Campus, Bobby Dodd Stadium at Historic Grant Field serves as the stadium for the Georgia Tech Yellow Jackets football team. Originally built in 1913, the stadium is the oldest on-campus stadium in NCAA Division I FBS and has been the site of more home wins than any other FBS stadium.

McCamish Pavilion 

Located on the northeast corner of campus, Hank McCamish Pavilion serves as the home venue for both the Georgia Tech Yellow Jackets basketball team and the Georgia Tech Yellow Jackets women's basketball team. Originally known as Alexander Memorial Coliseum, the arena has been a fixture on campus since its construction in 1956 and experienced a massive renovation and re-opening in 2012.

Russ Chandler Stadium 

Located in Central Campus on Ferst Drive, Russ Chandler Stadium at Rose Bowl Field serves as the home venue for the Georgia Tech Yellow Jackets baseball team. The venue originally opened in 1930 and experienced a major renovation in 2002.

Mewborn Field 
Located on East Campus, Shirley Clements Mewborn Field has served as the home field for the Georgia Tech Yellow Jackets softball team since its opening on March 10, 2009. Prior to its construction, the softball team's home field was Glenn Field, located off campus adjacent to Atlantic Station.

Byers Tennis Complex 
Located on East Campus across the street from McCamish Pavilion, the Ken Byers Tennis Complex is the home venue for both the Georgia Tech men's and women's tennis teams. Opened in January 2013 on the site of the former Bill Moore Tennis Center, the complex is named after Tech alum Ken Byers, whose generous donation aided in its construction. The complex's indoor facility (which maintains the Bill Moore Tennis Center name) features six courts, while the outdoor facility features six competition courts and four practice courts.

O'Keefe Gymnasium 
Located on East Campus and originally utilized as the gymnasium for O'Keefe High School in the 1950s, O'Keefe Gymnasium was gifted to the Georgia Institute of Technology in the 1960s and has served as the home venue for the Georgia Tech Yellow Jackets volleyball team since 1995. Since 1995 the facility has witnessed multiple renovations and improvements, including the addition of a new floor in 2003 and a massive renovation in 2006 that included new locker rooms, a training room, and a study area.

Campus Recreation Center

McAuley Aquatic Center 

Located on West Campus, within the Campus Recreation Center, the McAuley Aquatic Center serves as the home venue for the Georgia Tech Yellow Jackets swimming and diving program. Formerly known as the Georgia Tech Aquatic Center, the facility was constructed for the 1996 Olympic Games and was host to all swimming, diving, and synchronized swimming events. The center was officially renamed in 2016 in honor of Georgia Tech alum James Herbert "Herb" McAuley, who had previously served as a swim coach at Georgia Tech.

Noonan Golf Facility 
Situated slightly off main campus, (just north of Home Park) the Noonan Golf Facility is a 13-acre golf complex where members of the Georgia Tech Yellow Jackets golf team practice. Named for two Georgia Tech alums, Kim P. Noonan and Thomas E. Noonan, the facility opened on February 17, 2017 and includes the David Dorman Short Game Area and the Linda and Ray Helton Par 3 Course.

Miscellaneous buildings

Academy of Medicine 

Located slightly north of Tech Square, the Academy of Medicine is an historic building located in Midtown Atlanta which was acquired by the Georgia Institute of Technology in 2008. The building was constructed in 1941 to serve as the headquarters for the Atlanta Medical Society, now known as the Medical Association of Atlanta. In 2010, the Institute launched a $6 million renovation project, with the building reopening the following year.

Beringause Building 

Located at the corner of Ferst Drive and Hemphill Avenue on West Campus, the Gary F. Beringause Building serves as the headquarters for the Georgia Tech Police Department. The building is named in honor of Sergeant Gary F. Beringause, a GTPD officer who died in 1986 while on duty. On September 18, 2017, the building was the site of a violent protest caused by the Scout Schultz incident. The protest led to the arrest of three individuals, and a police car was torched in the protest.

The building is currently slated for demolition following the completion of a new campus safety facility. The location of the building will become part of a new campus greenspace.

Crum & Forster Building 

Located on Tech Square, the Crum & Forster Building is an historic building that was completed in 1927. Originally built as the headquarters for Crum & Forster, an insurance house founded in 1896, the building was designed by Ed Ivey and Lewis "Buck" Crook, both Georgia Tech graduates. The building was purchased by the Georgia Institute of Technology in 2007, with the intention to demolish the building to make space for surface parking. However, the Atlanta Preservation Society intervened and headed a preservation campaign which led to the building being granted landmark status by the City Council of Atlanta in 2009. Ultimately, Georgia Tech agreed to preserve the main façade of the building while demolishing approximately two-thirds of the building to make space for the Coda Building. This demolition was carried out in 2013. There are currently plans for the Crum & Forster Building to be used for retail space following the construction of the Coda Building.

Student Center 

Located on Central Campus, the Georgia Tech Student Center is dedicated to recreation and socialization for Georgia Tech students. Constructed in 1970, the building initially covered about 100,000 square feet and contained, among other features, a Post Office, cafeteria, ballroom, and one of the only on-campus bowling alleys in the Southeast. The bowling alley is now a part of Tech Rec, a part of the Student Center which also houses multiple billiards tables, ping pong tables, and video game consoles. This initial portion is today known as the Fred B. Wenn Building. In 2010, Under the Couch moved from its previous location on West Campus to its current location on the second floor of the Wenn building.

In 2004, the student center expanded with the addition of a new building, the Penny and Roe Stamps Student Center Commons, which included additional lounge areas, meeting spaces, and the offices of the Student Government Association. In 2010 a "fast-food" food court was added to the Stamps building.

Whitehead Building (Student Health Center) 
Located next to the CRC on West Campus is the 40,000 square foot Joseph Brown Whitehead Building, which houses the Stamps Health Services, the on-campus health clinic. The building opened in 2003 and is the third on-campus health clinic to carry the Joseph Brown Whitehead name. The first such building (renamed the Chapin Building) remains on campus and is a part of Georgia Tech's Historic District. The building's namesake, Joseph Brown Whitehead, was an early bottler of Coca-Cola whose wife, Lettie Pate Whitehead, made significant donations to the Institution.

Former buildings

Woodruff Dining Hall 
The George and Irene Woodruff Dining Hall, colloquially referred to as Woody's, was the sole dining hall of West Campus from its opening in 1985 until its closure in 2017. A buffet-style dining hall similar to those on East Campus, the hall was located between Woodruff North and Woodruff South and served as a connector for the two buildings. Its closing in 2017 coincided with the opening of West Village (its de facto successor) and the closing of West Campus Market, a small market located in the Curran Street Parking Deck next to a Wing Zone.

Notable landmarks and locations

Kessler Campanile 

The Kessler Campanile is an 80-foot-tall (24 m) campanile located on Central Campus. The structure and its surrounding amphitheater can be found adjacent to the Student Center at the end of Tech Walkway. The steel obelisk rises from a shallow pool (which includes a small fountain) and is surrounded by a 300-seat pavilion. It was named after Tech alum Richard C. Kessler and originally built for the 1996 Olympic Games.

Burger Bowl 

Burger Bowl is an athletic field located on West Campus at the intersection of Hemphill Avenue and Ferst Drive. It is adjacent to the CRC Roe Stamps Fields and located behind the Fitten, Freeman, and Montag residence halls. The field's peculiar name comes from a since-closed Burger King located across the street from the field. The bowl is often used for intramural sports and is currently the home venue for the Georgia Tech Rugby team.

The Hill (Freshman Hill) 
The Hill refers to the area comprising the Historic District and part of East Campus. Many of the initial buildings, such as Tech Tower, were built on an actual hill, and the name continues to refer to both the area and the Georgia Tech administration as a whole. Due to the location of East Campus residence halls at the base of the hill, the term Freshman Hill has been applied to the steep incline of Bobby Dodd Way, a road that many freshman must walk to get to academic buildings on the other side of the hill. For instance, in 2018 The Technique ran an April Fools' Day article discussing the creation of a chair lift up Freshman Hill.

Tech Green 

Tech Green is a 3.2 acre green space located on Central Campus, bordered by Clough Commons to the east and Tech Walkway to the south. The Student Center and Kessler Campanile are located to the southwest of the space. Directly underneath Tech Green lies a 1.4 million gallon cistern system. According to the Georgia Tech Arboretum, as of 2016 there were 949 trees located on Tech Green, with a canopy cover of over 33,000 square feet. Tech Walkway, formerly known as and often still referred to as Skiles Walkway, cuts through a part of Tech Green and connects the Student Center to several academic buildings, such as the CULC and Library. The walkway serves as a popular venue for canvassers of various student groups.

References

External links
 Georgia Tech Building List
 Georgia Tech Campus Map

Educational institutions established in 1885
Georgia Tech
Business incubators of the United States
1885 establishments in Georgia (U.S. state)